Amalafrida (before 475 – fl. 523), was queen of the Vandals by marriage to Thrasamund. She was the daughter of Theodemir, king of the Ostrogoths, and his wife Erelieva. She was the sister of Theodoric the Great, and mother of Theodahad, both of whom also were kings of the Ostrogoths.

In 500, Theodoric, ruler over the Ostrogothic Kingdom in Italy, arranged a marriage alliance with Thrasamund, king of the Vandals in North Africa, to further cement his authority over the Vandals. Thrasamund became Amalfrida's second husband. She brought a very large dowry, but also 1 000 Gothic elite warriors plus 5 000 armed retainers.

After her husband Thrasamund's death, his successor Hilderic issued orders for the return of all the Catholic bishops from exile, and Boniface, a strenuous asserter of orthodoxy, bishop of the African Church. In response, Amalfrida headed a party of revolt; she called in the assistance of the Moors, and battle was joined at Capsa, about three hundred miles to the south of the capital Carthage, on the edge of the Libyan desert.

In 523, Amalafrida's party was beaten, and Hilderic had her arrested and imprisoned in a successful bid to overthrow Ostrogothic hegemony; he also had her Gothic soldiers killed. She died in prison, exact date unknown.

Amalafrida had two children, the aforementioned Theodahad and Amalaberga, who married Hermanfrid, king of the Thuringii. It is not known who the father of these children was.

Bibliography
 J.R. Martindale, The Prosopography of the Later Roman Empire, vol. 2, Cambridge 1980, pp. 63-64.
 M. Cristini, Il seguito ostrogoto di Amalafrida: confutazione di Procopio, Bellum Vandalicum 1.8.12, in «Klio», 99 (2017), pp. 278-289.

Sources

6th-century deaths
Year of birth unknown
Ostrogothic women
Princesses
Women in medieval European warfare
Amali dynasty
6th-century Ostrogothic people
Queens consort
6th-century women
6th-century murdered monarchs